Events in the year 2020 in Costa Rica.

Incumbents 

 President: Carlos Alvarado Quesada
 First Vice President: Epsy Campbell Barr
 Second Vice President: Marvin Rodríguez Cordero

Events 
2 February – 2020 Costa Rican municipal elections including 2020 San José mayoral election
4 February – A Costa Rican judge nullifies a same-sex marriage between two women and fires the Civil law notary who performed the marriage in 2015.
7 February – The Office of the United Nations High Commissioner for Human Rights provides US$4.1 million for Nicaraguan and Venezuelan asylum seekers in Costa Rica.
15 February – Authorities in seize a record five tons of cocaine worth $130 million in the port of Limón.
 6 March – COVID-19 pandemic in Costa Rica: The first case of COVID-19 in the country is confirmed. The individual was a 49-year-old American woman who had arrived on a flight from New York on 1 March and did not exhibit symptoms at the time. She was isolated in a San José lodging along with her husband who had also been in contact with infected persons in New York.
13 March – COVID-19 pandemic: Leaders of Costa Rica, Belize, Guatemala, Honduras, Nicaragua, Panama, and the Dominican Republic sign an agreement for dealing with the coronavirus pandemic. It includes canceling the Costa Rican film festival.
 18 March – COVID-19 pandemic: An 87-year-old man becomes the first COVID-19 death in Costa Rica.
28 March – Panama and Costa Rica fail in attempts to move thousands of migrants from Africa, Asia, and Haiti amassed in shelters as a precaution against COVID-19. Costa Rica has 295 confirmed cases and two deaths.
26 May – Same-sex marriage in Costa Rica: Costa Rica becomes the first country in Central America to legalize same-sex marriage.
28 May 28 – COVID-19 pandemic: Legislative leaders from Costa Rica meet with their counterparts from nine other Latin American countries to discuss a response to the COVID-19 pandemic.
24 August – A 6.2 M earthquake centered in Pochotal de Garabito, Puntarenas, is felt throughout the country. No damages are reported.
15 September – Independence Day: Before a reduced crowd, President Carlos Alvarado praises health workers, "today's heroes".
18 September – The government proposes a tax increase and austerity measures in order to get US $1.75 billion in aid from the International Monetary Fund (IMF).
15 December – Costa Rica builds an emission-free wooden ship capable of transporting 350 tons of cargo.
16 December – COVID-19 pandemic: Costa Rica approves the Pfizer-BioNTech COVID-19 vaccine and hope to begin applications in the first trimester of 2021.
23 December – “Afro-Latino Travels With Kim Haas,” a TV series honoring Afro-Latinos and highlighting Costa Rica, premiers on PBS.
24 December – COVID-19 pandemic: Vaccination begins.

Deaths
9 September – Henrietta Boggs, American-Costa Rican writer and socialite, former First Lady, subject of First Lady of the Revolution (b. 1918).
9 October – Teresita Aguilar, 87, politician, Deputy (2005–2006).
November 29 – José Rafael Barquero Arce, 89, Costa Rican Roman Catholic prelate, Auxiliary Bishop of Alajuela (1980–2007).

See also
2020 in the Caribbean
2020 in Central America
2020 Atlantic hurricane season

References 

 
2020s in Costa Rica
Years of the 21st century in Costa Rica
Costa Rica
Costa Rican